Synchortus is a genus of beetles in the family Noteridae, containing the following species:

 Synchortus abditus Guignot, 1959
 Synchortus asperatus (Fairmaire, 1869)
 Synchortus dabbenei Régimbart, 1895
 Synchortus desaegeri Gschwendtner, 1935
 Synchortus imbricatus (Klug, 1853)
 Synchortus leleupi Guignot, 1956
 Synchortus rugosopunctatus (Wehncke, 1876)
 Synchortus separatus Omer-Cooper, 1972
 Synchortus simplex Sharp, 1882

References

Noteridae